This is a list of films produced in Argentina in 2003:

See also
2003 in Argentina

External links and references
 Argentine films of 2003 at the Internet Movie Database

2003
Films
Argentine